Thomas Levaux (born March 20, 1980, in Le Creusot) is a French professional football player. Currently, he plays in the Championnat National for AS Moulins.

He played on the professional level in Ligue 2 for US Créteil-Lusitanos.

1980 births
Living people
French footballers
French expatriate footballers
Expatriate footballers in Brazil
Ligue 2 players
Sport Club Internacional players
América Futebol Clube (MG) players
US Créteil-Lusitanos players
AS Moulins players
CO Saint-Dizier players
Association football goalkeepers